Elections are held every four years in the off-year immediately after United States presidential election years in Albany, New York to elect the city's mayor.

Elections before 2005

2005

The 2005 Albany mayoral election occurred on November 8, 2005. Incumbent Democrat Gerald Jennings was reelected to a fourth consecutive term.

Primaries
Primary elections were held on September 13, 2005.

Democratic
Candidates
Gerald Jennings - incumbent mayor
Archie Goodbee - retired broadcasting executive

Conservative

General election
In the general election, Jennings defeated Green Party candidate Alice Green, and Republican Party candidate Joseph Sullivan, a perennial candidate and local activist. This was a great result for Green who, 7 years earlier as the running mate of Al Lewis, helped the nascent Green Party of New York to achieve automatic ballot access by winning over 50,000 votes in the 1998 New York gubernatorial election.

2009

The Albany, New York mayoral election of 2009 occurred on November 3, 2009. It saw the reelection of Democrat Gerald Jennings to a fifth consecutive term.

Democratic primary
The Democratic Party primary was held on September 15, 2009.  Incumbent Mayor Gerald Jennings defeated Corey Ellis, a city council member, by a vote of 8,130 to 6,301.

General election
In the general election, Jennings (running on both the Democratic and Conservative Party lines) defeated Ellis (running as the Working Families Party candidate), and Republican Party candidate Nathan Lebron.  Jennings got 10,466 votes in total, Ellis came in second with 4,801 votes, and LeBron got 1,178 votes; there were also a few dozen write-in votes.

2013

The Albany, New York mayoral election of 2013 took place on November 5, 2013. The general election was preceded by the primaries on September 10, 2013. The winner of the election was Democratic nominee Kathy Sheehan.

Incumbent Democratic mayor Gerald Jennings did not seek reelection.

Background
The 2013 mayoral election was the City of Albany's first open-seat mayoral election since 1993. Incumbent mayor Gerald Jennings announced on May 14, 2013, that he would not run for a sixth term. Jennings is the second-longest-serving mayor in the history of Albany (Erastus Corning 2nd was the city's longest-tenured mayor).

Democratic primary
On November 17, 2012, Sheehan announced herself as a candidate for mayor.  On September 10, 2013, Sheehan defeated Corey Ellis in the Democratic primary.  According to official returns released on October 9, Sheehan won the Democratic nomination with 7,468 votes (65.72%) to Ellis's 3,294 votes (28.99%), with 601 write in votes (5.29%) and a few void and blank ballots.

General election
In addition to Sheehan, who ran on the Democratic, Working Families, and Independence Party lines, Jesse D. Calhoun was the candidate of the Republican Party, Joseph P. Sullivan ran on the Conservative Party line, and Theresa M. Portelli (a former Albany City school board member) ran on the Green Party line.

On November 5, Sheehan won the general election in a landslide, receiving over 83% of the total vote.

2017

The 2017 mayoral election in Albany, New York, was held on November 7, 2017, and resulted in the incumbent Kathy Sheehan, a member of the Democratic Party, being re-elected to a second term over Conservative Party candidate Joseph Sullivan, Green Party candidate Bryan Jimenez, and Independence Party candidate Frank Commisso Jr.

Democratic primary
Sheehan won the Democratic primary election with less than 50 percent of the vote. Frank Commisso Jr., a member of the Albany Common Council; and Carolyn McLaughlin, the president of the Common Council, also ran.

General election
Commisso ran again in the general election as the candidate of the Independence Party. He criticized Sheehan over her handling of the city's finances and on the issue of tax breaks. Sheehan responded to Commisso's criticism through television advertisements, which were funded by a $387,000 loan from Sheehan to her campaign.

2021

The 2021 mayoral election in Albany, New York, was held on November 2, 2021. Incumbent Democratic mayor Kathy Sheehan won re-election to a third term in office.

Democratic primary

Candidates

Declared
Valerie Faust, reverend and write-in candidate for mayor in 2009 and 2013
Kathy Sheehan, incumbent mayor

Disqualified
Marlon Anderson, advocate (continued as a write-in candidate)
Lukee Forbes, activist

Declined
Dorcey Applyrs, Chief City Auditor of Albany (endorsed Sheehan)
Corey Ellis, president of the Albany Common Council and candidate for mayor in 2009 and 2013 (endorsed Sheehan)

Republican primary

Candidates
Alicia Purdy, radio host (also nominated by the Conservative Party)

Third-party and independent candidates
Greg Aidala, comedian and activist (Independence Party)
Ved Dookhun (Socialist Workers Party)

General election

References